Syncarpha is a genus of herbaceous flowering plants in the family Asteraceae. The flowers are known by the common name:   everlastings. The genus is endemic to the fynbos of the Eastern and Western Cape in South Africa.

 Species
Species accepted by the Plants of the World Online as of December 2022:

References

External links
 Biodiversity Explorer Syncarpha

Flora of South Africa
Gnaphalieae
Asteraceae genera